Habrosyne dentata is a moth in the family Drepanidae. It is found in China (Shaanxi, Sichuan, Yunnan).

References

Moths described in 1966
Thyatirinae